Kaczorowski (feminine: Kaczorowska, plural: Kaczorowscy) is a Polish surname. Notable people with this surname include:

 Aleksander Kaczorowski (born 1969), Polish bohemist, journalist, editor, writer and translator
Fr Henryk Kaczorowski (1888–1942), one of the 108 Martyrs of World War Two
 Karolina Kaczorowska (born 1930), widow of Ryszard Kaczorowski
 Klaudia Kaczorowska (born 1988), Polish female volleyball player
Maciej Kaczorowski (born 1980), Polish footballer
Mick Kaczorowski (born 1960), American producer and executive producer
 Nina Kaczorowski (born 1975), American actress and stuntwoman
Paweł Kaczorowski (born 1949, Polish cyclist
 Paweł Kaczorowski (born 1974), Polish footballer
 Peter Kaczorowski (born 1956), American stage lighting designer
 Ryszard Kaczorowski (1919–2010), last Polish President in Exile

See also
Kaczor

Polish-language surnames